Lori Vanessa Nero (August 8, 1980)  is a former professional basketball player. She played college basketball at Auburn University and University of Louisville.

Auburn statistics 
Source Source

References

External links
WNBA.com: Draft 2003

1980 births
Living people
Auburn Tigers women's basketball players
Centers (basketball)
Louisville Cardinals women's basketball players
Power forwards (basketball)
Basketball players from Baton Rouge, Louisiana